June Heath (born 29 June 1929) is an Australian former athlete. She competed in the women's javelin throw at the 1956 Summer Olympics.

References

External links
 

1929 births
Possibly living people
Athletes (track and field) at the 1956 Summer Olympics
Australian female javelin throwers
Olympic athletes of Australia
Place of birth missing (living people)